Me and My Gal is a 1932 American pre-Code drama and romantic comedy film starring Spencer Tracy and Joan Bennett, directed by Raoul Walsh, and released by the Fox Film Corporation. The film tells the story of jaunty young policeman Danny Dolan (Tracy), who falls in love with waterfront cafe waitress Helen Riley (Bennett). It is admired as a pre-Code classic today. According to TCM, it did well with critics and audiences, featuring fine performances from its  two stars,  “displaying the superb chemistry” that can be seen in their other pictures together.

Plot
In this wisecracking comedy, Danny Dolan (Spencer Tracy) is a cop whose beat is the New York waterfront. Danny has a soft spot for Helen Riley (Joan Bennett), a sharp-tongued waitress at a cheap diner, while her scatter-brained sister Kate (Marion Burns) is in love with Duke (George Walsh), a sleazy low-level mobster. While Duke makes a play for Kate, both Helen and Dan know that he's bad news, and Danny wants to put Duke behind bars before he can break Kate's heart.

Cast
Spencer Tracy as Danny Dolan
Joan Bennett as Helen Riley
Marion Burns as Kate Riley
George Walsh as Duke
J. Farrell MacDonald as Pop Riley
Noel Madison as Baby Face
Henry B. Walthall as Sarge
Bert Hanlon as Jake
Adrian Morris as Allen
George Chandler as Eddie Collins
Emmett Corrigan as Police Captain
Jesse De Vorska as Jake
Lemist Esler as Doctor
Hank Mann as Hank
Frank Moran as Drunk's Foil
Will Stanton as Drunk

Production

Development
Bennett and Tracy made She Wanted a Millionaire that same year, with their billing reversed (Bennett billed over Tracy), and also played a married couple two decades later in Father of the Bride and Father's Little Dividend.

Me and My Gal was directed by Raoul Walsh, one of the greatest directors of the studio system, having directed Regeneration (1915), The Big Trail (1930), White Heat (1949). He was also the brother of George Walsh, who plays the villain.

It was remade as a B film in 1940 by Fox as Pier 13, directed by Eugene Forde.

Preservation status
A copy is held in the U.S. Library of Congress collection.

References

External links
 1893-1993

Me and My Gal at the TCM Movie Database
Me and My Gal at Allmovie
 

1932 films
American black-and-white films
Films directed by Raoul Walsh
Fox Film films
1930s romantic comedy-drama films
American romantic comedy-drama films
1932 comedy films
1932 drama films
1930s American films
Silent romantic comedy films
Silent romantic drama films